Audrey Reid (born 25 March 1952) is a Jamaican athlete. She competed in the women's high jump at the 1968, 1972 and the 1976 Summer Olympics.

References

1952 births
Living people
Athletes (track and field) at the 1968 Summer Olympics
Athletes (track and field) at the 1972 Summer Olympics
Athletes (track and field) at the 1976 Summer Olympics
Jamaican female high jumpers
Olympic athletes of Jamaica
Athletes (track and field) at the 1967 Pan American Games
Athletes (track and field) at the 1971 Pan American Games
Pan American Games silver medalists for Jamaica
Pan American Games bronze medalists for Jamaica
Pan American Games medalists in athletics (track and field)
Athletes (track and field) at the 1970 British Commonwealth Games
Commonwealth Games competitors for Jamaica
Place of birth missing (living people)
Medalists at the 1967 Pan American Games
Medalists at the 1971 Pan American Games
20th-century Jamaican women
21st-century Jamaican women